Henry Hugo Youngman (born Heinrich Hugo Jungmann; November 21, 1865 – January 24, 1936) was a professional baseball player. He played part of one season in Major League Baseball for the Pittsburgh Alleghenys in 1890.

In the 13 games he played, he batted .128 (6-for-47) with four RBIs.  He also scored six runs. A second baseman and third baseman, he made 16 errors in 73 chances for a fielding percentage of .781, which was below the league average.

A native of Hörde, Germany, he died in Pittsburgh, Pennsylvania at the age of 70.

References

External links

American people of German descent
Major League Baseball infielders
Pittsburgh Alleghenys players
Danville Browns players
McKeesport (minor league baseball) players
Oakland Colonels players
Altoona Mud Turtles players
Lancaster Chicks players
Titusville (minor league baseball) players
Dayton Old Soldiers players
Dayton Veterans players
Major League Baseball players from Germany
19th-century baseball players
1865 births
1936 deaths